Lawrence "Larry" Goodwyn (July 16, 1928 – September 29, 2013) was an American writer and political theorist whose work transformed historians' understandings of American populism. He served as a professor at Duke University from 1971 to 2003.

Goodwyn was best known for writing Democratic Promise: The Populist Moment in America, a book which chronicles the origins and rise of the People's Party. The book was nominated for the National Book Award for Nonfiction in 1977, and it achieved finalist status. An abridged version of Democratic Promise, titled The Populist Moment: A Short History of the Agrarian Revolt in America, was published in 1978. The Populist Moment became a staple in university history seminars, labor organizing institutes and community activism efforts for years to come.

His publications generally focused on the Southern United States, but in 1991 he published Breaking the Barrier: the Rise of Solidarity in Poland, a book that focused on a working class movement from another region: Poland's Solidarnosc movement.

Background 
Born on July 16, 1928, Goodwyn graduated with a Bachelor’s Degree in English from Texas A&M University. He later served in the U.S. Army in the Korean War and eventually ascended to the rank of captain. After his military service, he completed a Ph.D at the University of Texas. During his youth and education in Texas, he observed the systematic nature of white supremacy—an observation that motivated him to fight against racism through his academic career and political activism.

Career 
Before beginning his academic career, Goodwyn's career as an investigative journalist motivated him to get involved in political activism alongside African American, Latino, and white working class groups. During his time serving as an editor of the Texas Observer, he organized voters to advocate for the election of Democrats in the early 1960s, including his assistance in founding the Democratic Coalition. Meanwhile, his reporting for the Texas Observer chronicled the local political activism.

In 1964, Goodwyn toured the southern U.S. to document Black community organizing in the harrowing struggle for civil rights. He began in the Mississippi Delta during the Mississippi Freedom Summer. He continued documenting the movement in Montgomery, Alabama, and met James Bevel, a leader of the Southern Christian Leadership Conference. Then, he moved on to Saint Augustine, Florida, where ongoing civil rights organizing had gained national attention. Through participant observation, Goodwyn witnessed the resilience of local Black activists despite white supremacist violence and presence in the local police force. His work in Saint Augustine culminated in his publication of a 1965 article in Harper’s Magazine, titled “Anarchy in Saint Augustine,” which documented the local struggle for civil rights.

Duke University hired Goodwyn as a professor in 1971. There, he and his colleagues, William Chafe and Ray Gavins, created Duke’s oral history program. According to the New York Times, the program “employed many black graduate students, in part because Dr. Goodwyn insisted that whites should not have sole possession of Southern history.” Not only did Goodwyn teach his students anti-racism, but he heavily emphasized that he, as a white man, constituted “part of the problem of authority,” radically owning his own privilege.

In 1976, he published his most well-known work, Democratic Promise: The Populist Moment in America—a book read widely at universities across the U.S.

Goodwyn retired from Duke University in 2003.

Books 

 1967 - The South Central States: Arkansas, Louisiana, Oklahoma, Texas (Time-Life library of America)
 1976 - Democratic Promise: The Populist Moment in America
 1978 - The Populist Moment: A Short History of the Agrarian Revolt in America (abridged version of Democratic Promise)
 1991 - Breaking the Barrier: The Rise of Solidarity in Poland
 1996 - Texas Oil, American Dreams: a Study of the Texas Independent Producers and Royalty Owners Association

References

1928 births
2013 deaths
Duke University faculty
Texas A&M University alumni
University of Texas alumni
Populism scholars
Historians from Texas